Farewell to Orpheus is an outdoor 1968–1973 bronze sculpture and fountain by Frederic Littman, installed at the Portland State University campus in Portland, Oregon, United States.

Description and history

Farewell to Orpheus, created by former Portland State University (PSU) art professor Frederic Littman in 1968, is located at Southwest Montgomery Street in the South Park Blocks. It depicts Eurydice and was installed in 1972–1973 as part of the South Park Blocks Urban Renewal Development Project. The fountain is one of four maintained by PSU, along with Walk of Heroines at Hoffman Hall, another in front of the Student Health and Counseling Building, and one at Urban Plaza.

The sculpture has always been surrounded by water but the fountain, which continually recycles 227 gallons of water, was not added until the 1990s. In 2009, PSU partnered with the City of Portland and the sculpture's owners to repair the fountain, which had not worked for nearly a decade. Repairs cost $6,000 and were funded in part by rentals on the South Park Blocks. Work included installation of new fountain heads, lights, and wiring, and re-sealing underwater surfaces. The repairs were completed by three PSU employees. Farewell to Orpheus has been described as a "seating refuge" for students and included in published walking tours of the city.

See also
 1968 in art
 1973 in art
 Fountains in Portland, Oregon
 Greek mythology in western art and literature
 Orpheus and Eurydice

References

External links
 Farewell to Orpheus, 1973 at cultureNOW

1973 establishments in Oregon
1973 sculptures
Bronze sculptures in Oregon
Fountains in Portland, Oregon
Ancient Greece in art and culture
Nude sculptures in Oregon
Orpheus
Outdoor sculptures in Portland, Oregon
Portland State University campus
Sculptures of classical mythology
Sculptures of women
South Park Blocks
Statues in Portland, Oregon